Jackie Filgo and Jeff Filgo are a married screenwriting and television writing team.

Biography 
Jeff and Jackie Filgo met while working on the production staff of Mad About You.

In television, their credits include Ink, the US adaptation of Men Behaving Badly, That '70s Show, Happy Hour (also creators),  The New Adventures of Old Christine, Hank, and Man with a Plan.

In film, they co-wrote the screenplay for Diary of a Wimpy Kid (2010) and wrote the screenplay for Take Me Home Tonight (2011), starring Topher Grace, who they previously worked with on That '70s Show.

They live in Los Angeles with their two children.

Filmography

Film

Television

Animation

References

External links

American screenwriters
American television producers
American television writers
Married couples
Screenwriting duos
American women screenwriters
American women television writers
Living people
Place of birth missing (living people)
Year of birth missing (living people)
American women television producers
21st-century American women